Parterre Box (often stylized as parterre box)  is an online magazine devoted to opera, about which it cultivates a campy, critical, strongly opinionated attitude with explicit gay overtones. The publication was founded by the New Yorker James Jorden in 1993 during a period of under-employment as an opera director. It appeared bimonthly from 1993 to 2001 in print form, but it is now solely published on the Web, where it is considered an influential opera blog.

In May 2005, Jorden introduced the first regular opera podcast entitled "Unnatural Acts of Opera." For this show, Jorden takes on the drag persona of "La Cieca", a gossipy commentator. La Cieca introduces a single act of what she calls "demented" opera, concentrating on exciting live vocal performances from around 1950 to the present. The podcasts appear to have ended in 2009 and were apparently available through various services including iTunes as well as in streaming form on the parterre.com website.

A highlight of the 2006 season of "Unnatural Acts of Opera" was the first podcast ever of Richard Wagner's four-opera cycle Der Ring des Nibelungen, an event Jorden termed "Podderdammerung". Jorden has also contributed a number of opera video clips to YouTube, concentrating on his favorite divas, including Renata Scotto, Leonie Rysanek and Dame Gwyneth Jones.

From 2009-13, Jorden contributed opera reviews to the New York Post.

References

Further reading
"You Go Diva!", The New York Times, April 27, 1997. Accessed April 7, 2022.
"The Parterre Posse", The New York Observer, January 29, 2001. Accessed January 18, 2008.
Lynn Neary, "When Opera Fans Attack", NPR: Morning Edition, June 26, 2003.
"Voice of the Opposition", Opera News, July 2009. Accessed February 9, 2011.
"The Bewitching Art of 'La Cieca'" by Zachary Woolfe, The New York Observer, July 8, 2009. Accessed February 9, 2011.

External links 
 

Magazines about opera
Music blogs
Magazines published in New York City
Online magazines published in the United States
Magazines established in 1993
1993 establishments in New York City